The Florida State League Hall of Fame was created in 2009 to honor the best players, managers, umpires and executives in the long history of the Florida State League. The inaugural class was selected by a committee and be officially enshrined in November. It included all current Hall of Famers who played in the FSL.

Key

Members

See also
Baseball awards#Double-A

References

External links
Official website

Hall
Minor league baseball museums and halls of fame
Halls of fame in Florida
Minor league baseball trophies and awards
Awards established in 2009
2009 establishments in Florida